Hugh Forde may refer to:

Hugh Forde (boxer) (born 1964), English boxer of the 1980s and 1990s
Hugh Forde (footballer) (born 1936),  Northern Irish footballer

See also
Hugh Ford (disambiguation)